Heterobranchus boulengeri is a species of airbreathing catfish found in the Democratic Republic of the Congo, Zambia and Zimbabwe.  It is found in Lake Mweru, the Lukonzolwa River and the upper Congo River.

Etymology
The fish is named in honor of ichthyologist-herpetologist George A. Boulenger (1858-1937), of the British Museum (Natural History), who had described many of the fishes from Central Africa and the Congo River system.

Description
Heterobranchus boulengeri has short barbels. Its gill arches extend anteriorly. This species can reach 64.0 cm (25.2 inches) TL in length.

Habitat
Heterobranchus boulengeri is found in tropical freshwater rivers and lakes. It is demersal, preferring the bottom of these bodies of water.

References

Teugels, G.G., B. Denayer and M. Legendre, 1990. A systematic revision of the African catfish genus Heterobranchus Geoffroy-Saint-Hilaire, 1809 (Pisces: Clariidae). Zool. J. Linn. Soc. 98:237-257.

Fish of Africa
Clariidae
Fish described in 1922
Taxa named by Jacques Pellegrin